Kees Adrianus Ludovicus Aarts (30 November 1941 – 26 November 2008) was a Dutch soccer player who played in the United Soccer Association. He represented the Netherlands at international level once in 1966.

Career statistics

Club

Notes

References

1941 births
2008 deaths
Dutch footballers
Netherlands international footballers
Dutch expatriate footballers
Association football forwards
Willem II (football club) players
ADO Den Haag players
San Francisco Golden Gate Gales players
Go Ahead Eagles players
United Soccer Association players
Eredivisie players
Expatriate soccer players in the United States
Dutch expatriate sportspeople in the United States
People from Baarle-Nassau
Footballers from North Brabant